Oncometopia orbona, the broad-headed sharpshooter, is a species of sharpshooter in the family Cicadellidae.

References

Further reading

External links

 

Insects described in 1798
Proconiini